The 1989 Irish general election to the 26th Dáil was held on Thursday, 15 June, three weeks after the dissolution of the 25th Dáil on 25 May by President Patrick Hillery, on the request of Taoiseach Charles Haughey. The general election took place in 41 Dáil constituencies throughout Ireland for 166 seats in Dáil Éireann, the house of representatives of the Oireachtas, on the same day as the European Parliament election.

The 26th Dáil met at Leinster House on 29 June to nominate the Taoiseach for appointment by the president and to approve the appointment of a new government of Ireland. No government was formed on that date, but on 12 July, Haughey was re-appointed Taoiseach, forming the 21st Government of Ireland, a coalition government of Fianna Fáil and the Progressive Democrats.

Campaign
The general election of 1989 was precipitated by the defeat of the minority Fianna Fáil government in a private members motion regarding the provision of funds for AIDS sufferers (haemophiliacs who had been infected with contaminated blood products by the HSE). While a general election was not necessary – the motion was not a vote of confidence, and therefore defeat was merely an embarrassment for the government – Charles Haughey, the Fianna Fáil leader, sought a dissolution of the Dáil.

Opinion polls had shown that the party's strong performance in government had increased their popularity and an overall majority for Fianna Fáil could be a possibility. Also, rumours were current that the general election was called so that certain Fianna Fáil members could raise money privately for themselves. While these rumours were dismissed at the time, it was revealed more than ten years later that Ray Burke, Pádraig Flynn and Haughey himself had received substantial personal donations during the campaign.

While it was thought that the general election would catch the opposition parties unprepared, they co-ordinated themselves and co-operated very quickly. Further cuts in spending, particularly in the health service, became the dominant issue. Alan Dukes was fighting his first (and as events would prove, his only) general election as leader of Fine Gael. His Tallaght Strategy had kept Fianna Fáil in power, governing as a minority, since 1987.

The general election was held on the same day as the election to the European Parliament, and turnout was 68.5%.

Results

|}

Independents include Independent Fianna Fáil (6,961 votes, 1 seat), Army Wives (6,966 votes) and Gay candidates (517 votes).

No by-elections had taken place during the previous Dáil. Two seats were vacant at the dissolution of the 25th Dáil in Sligo–Leitrim caused by the resignation of the Fianna Fáil member Ray MacSharry and in Dublin South-Central caused by the death of Frank Cluskey.

While Fianna Fáil had hoped to achieve an overall majority, the party actually lost seats. The result was a disaster for Fianna Fáil, particularly when the election was so unnecessary. Fine Gael made a small gain, but nothing substantial. The Progressive Democrats did badly, losing over half their deputies. The Labour Party and the Workers' Party gained working class votes from Fianna Fáil, but failed to make the big breakthrough, while Sinn Féin polled even worse than its 1987 result. The Green Party won its first seat when Roger Garland was elected for Dublin South.

Voting summary

Seats summary

Government formation
Forming a government proved to be extremely difficult. Many in Fianna Fáil had hoped that the minority government could continue where it left off, particularly if the Tallaght Strategy continued. However, Fine Gael refused to support the government and so a deadlock developed. The prospect of forming a government seemed remote, so much so that Charles Haughey was forced to formally resign as Taoiseach. For the first time in Irish history a Taoiseach and a government had not been appointed when the new Dáil met. However, twenty-seven days after the general election, Fianna Fáil entered into a coalition for the first time in its history – with the Progressive Democrats, forming the 21st Government of Ireland, led by Haughey as Taoiseach. In February 1992, Haughey resigned and was succeeded as Taoiseach by Albert Reynolds, forming the 22nd Government of Ireland, continuing in coalition with the Progressive Democrats.

Dáil membership changes
The following changes took place as a result of the election:
14 outgoing TDs retired
1 vacant seat at election time
150 outgoing TDs stood for re-election (also Seán Treacy, the outgoing Ceann Comhairle who was automatically returned)
124 of those were re-elected
26 failed to be re-elected
41 successor TDs were elected
32 were elected for the first time
9 had previously been TDs
There were 4 successor female TDs, replacing 5 outgoing, thus reducing the total by 1 to 13
There were changes in 30 of the 41 constituencies contested

Where more than one change took place in a constituency the concept of successor is an approximation for presentation only.

See also
Members of the 19th Seanad

Notes

References

Further reading

External links
GuthanPhobail.net, Results 

1989 in Irish politics
1989
26th Dáil
June 1989 events in Europe
1989 elections in the Republic of Ireland